Valencia College is a public college in Orlando, Florida. It is part of the Florida College System. The college was founded in 1967 as Valencia Junior College and changed its name in 2010 because the academic scope of the school had expanded to include bachelor's degrees. Valencia has several campus locations in Orlando with additional campus locations in Winter Park and Kissimmee.

Seal

The official seal of the college includes the coat of arms of Valencia, Spain, in the middle and the entire diamond design stems from it. However, the college is not named for the city in Spain, but rather for the Valencia oranges which used to be prevalent in Central Florida.

Student profile
College-wide Headcount was 68,351 for 2015.

51.6% AA
48.6% AS/AAS/Certificate

Race/Ethnicity Diversity Enrollment:
17.9% African American, 
4.9% Asian/Pacific Islander, 
32.5% Caucasian, 
32.5% Hispanic, 
0.3% Native American, 
11.5% Other

Locations
Valencia College operates a total of eight campuses and three sites in its service area, which encompasses Orange County and Osceola County. Its district office is in Orlando.

 
Downtown Campus - A state of the art campus inaugurated over Fall 2019. The only Valencia Campus that currently offers student housing, and is also shared with UCF.
West Campus -  Which houses High-tech programs like engineering, architecture, math, and health sciences.
East Campus - Home of the School of Arts and Entertainment
Winter Park Campus
Poinciana Campus
Osceola Campus
Lake Nona Campus
School of Public Safety

Training facilities
Advanced Manufacturing Training Center: Kissimmee
Accelerated Skills Training: Downtown Campus
Accelerated Skills Training: Northwest Orlando
Accelerated Skills Training: Osceola Campus
Accelerated Skills Training: Poinciana Campus
Fire Training Facility: Orlando

Academics

UCF Partnership
A longstanding partnership between Valencia College and the University of Central Florida has contributed to Valencia's transfer rate, considered to be the highest in the country. The DirectConnect to UCF program guarantees Valencia graduates acceptance and streamlined admission to the University of Central Florida. Since the program's inception in 2006, approximately 45,000 students have indicated that they are DirectConnect students.

School of Public Safety
The Valencia College School of Public Safety houses three major program areas: Criminal Justice, Fire Rescue and Safety and Security. Valencia College will train the next generation of public safety professionals using state-of-the-art technology and the latest in simulation training. Programs for firefighters, law enforcement, corrections, security officers and homeland security elevate and unify training standards across all divisions of public safety. This interdisciplinary approach promotes cross-sector training and collaboration between public safety agencies that help make our communities safer—both in times of crisis and in maintaining the peace.

 The Criminal Justice Institute occupies a  state-of-the-art criminal justice training facility.  The CJI is certified and approved by Florida Department of Law Enforcement (FDLE) to operate law enforcement and corrections academies, advanced courses and specialized training. Valencia is one of 4 colleges in Florida that trains Department of Juvenile Justice recruit officers.
 The Fire Rescue Institute provides career pathways to meet the needs of the fire service community in Central Florida and prepares all levels of fire service professionals, including the fire fighter, fire officer, fire inspector, fire investigator and fire instructor.
 The Safety and Security Institute is still in development. The Safety and Security Institute will build upon programming already being offered by Valencia College and the School of Public Safety to provide professional and leadership training for private security officers and managers, as well as homeland security specialists. The Safety and Security Institute will be the first of its kind to provide standardized training and certifications to the security professionals working within Central Florida's many airports, hotels, theme parks and attractions.

Valencia Continuing Education and Professional Training

Valencia Continuing Education and Professional Training is located at West Campus. Valencia's continuing education, training and professional development division of Valencia College serves businesses, government agencies, individuals and organizations of all sizes, across every industry throughout the Central Florida community.

Valencia International and Continuing Education is located alongside the continuing education and professional training division at West Campus. Valencia's International and Continuing Education division offers conversational English and Spanish courses, cultural diversity workshops, American sign language and corporate training programs to prepare students for entry into a college degree program.

Accreditation
Commission on Colleges of the Southern Association of Colleges and Schools

Awards
 Winner of the 2011 Aspen Prize for Community College Excellence. 
 Named "best community college in the nation" for dedication to student success by the Aspen Institute.
 Chosen by Time Magazine in 2001 as one of the nation's best schools at helping first-year students excel.

Athletics
Although Valencia is not a member of the National Junior College Athletic Association (NJCAA), Intramural sports are available. The Valencia College Brain Bowl team participates as a member of the Florida State College Activities Association and has won ten national community college championships at NAQT and six state championships.

Notable alumni
Bob Allen, politician and member of the Florida House of Representatives 32nd District .
Rich Crotty (1970), 3rd Mayor of Orange County, Florida.
Dick Batchelor (1970), former Florida State Representative; business person, named one of “The 50 Most Powerful People” by Orlando Magazine (2004 to 2015)
Paul Davis, former Major League Baseball pitching coach.
Al Weiss (1974), business person, President of Worldwide Operations, Walt Disney Parks and Resorts.
Scott Fletcher (1978), baseball player
Tim Crews, baseball player 
Mike Bielecki (1979), baseball player
Brian Butterfield, baseball coach 
Wes Platt (1989), journalist and author
Gregg Hale (1992), filmmaker and producer
Howie Dorough (1993), Backstreet Boys member
Chris Kirkpatrick (1993), 'N Sync member
Sharon Lewis (1993), television personality and film director
Olindo Mare (1994), football player
Scott Stapp (attended), Creed member
Chase Stokes, Actor
Ben Saunders (attended), professional fighter, Mixed Martial Artist
Chris Latvala, Florida House of Representatives, 67th District
Linda Stewart, Member of Florida Senate, representing the 13th district.
Salina de la Renta, professional wrestler
Carmelo Ríos Santiago, (attended) Puerto Rican senator, Majority Leader of the Puerto Rico Senate
Dave Martinez, baseball coach and manager for the Washington Nationals.
Aaron Jackson, a  human rights and environmental activist.
Dahvie Vanity (attended), former Blood on the Dance Floor member
Daisy Morales (attended), Florida House of Representatives 48th District
Kim Young, professional golfer
Maxwell Alejandro Frost, activist and politician

References

External links

 

Florida College System
Two-year colleges in the United States
Universities and colleges in Orlando, Florida
Universities and colleges accredited by the Southern Association of Colleges and Schools
Educational institutions established in 1967
1967 establishments in Florida
Robert A. M. Stern buildings